The 1965 South Dakota Coyotes football team was an American football team that represented the University of South Dakota in the North Central Conference (NCC) during the 1965 NCAA College Division football season. In its second season under head coach Marv Rist, the team compiled a 2–8 record (0–6 against NCC opponents), finished in seventh place out of seven teams in the NCC, and was outscored by a total of 326 to 61. The team played its home games at Inman Field in Vermillion, South Dakota.

Schedule

References

South Dakota
South Dakota Coyotes football seasons
South Dakota Coyotes football